Ahmed Al-Abdulali (born 18 June 1988) is a Saudi Arabian handball player for Mudhar and the Saudi Arabia national team.

References

1988 births
Living people
Saudi Arabian male handball players
Place of birth missing (living people)
Handball players at the 2010 Asian Games
Handball players at the 2018 Asian Games
Asian Games competitors for Saudi Arabia
21st-century Saudi Arabian people
20th-century Saudi Arabian people